This is a list of Malaysian films produced and released in 2015. Most of the film are produced in the Malay language, but there also a significant number of films that are produced in English, Mandarin, Cantonese and Tamil.

2015

January – March

April – June

July – September

October – December

References

External links
Malaysian film at the Internet Movie Database
Malaysian Feature Films Finas
Cinema Online Malaysia

Malaysia
2015
2015 in Malaysia